Mark Andrew Beck (born 2 February 1994) is a professional footballer who plays as a forward for  club Solihull Moors. He played in the Football League for Carlisle United, Yeovil Town and Harrogate Town, and in the Scottish Championship for Falkirk, as well as spending several years in non-league football. Beck was born in England, and represented Scotland at under-19 level.

Career

Carlisle United
Beck was born in Sunderland, Tyne and Wear. He started his career in the youth team of Carlisle United and signed a two-year apprenticeship in the summer of 2010.

Beck made his professional debut for Carlisle on 14 April, in a 1–0 defeat to Charlton Athletic, coming on as a substitute for Tom Taiwo. On 19 April 2012, Beck was offered a one-year professional contract. He scored his first goal for the club on 28 August 2012 in a 2–1 win against Ipswich Town in the League Cup with a 90th-minute header.

Workington (loan)
In March 2012, he joined Conference North club Workington on a one-month loan to gain first-team experience. He made his debut on 25 March in a 1–0 win over Harrogate Town, coming on as a substitute for Gareth Arnison. He scored the equalising goal for Workington in a 1–1 draw with Droylsden. Beck made four appearances in his short spell, scoring one goal.

Falkirk (loan)
On 30 January 2014, Beck joined Falkirk in the Scottish Championship on loan until the end of the season. He teamed up with former strike-partner Rory Loy at 'The Bairns'.

He quickly struck up a strong partnership with Loy, and after two substitute appearances, settled into a starting berth in the Falkirk team. He added another dimension to Falkirk's play; he offered them an out ball, someone who could hold the ball up and help his team get out to support Loy and himself up front. He scored the only goal of the match in a 1–0 away victory against Dundee on 29 March 2014. He was also the scorer of an equaliser in the Scottish Premiership play-off semi-final first leg against Hamilton Academical on 13 May 2014, converting a cut-back from Loy.

His final appearance for Falkirk came in the play-off semi-final second leg defeat to Hamilton, in which his team lost 1–0 (2–1 on aggregate). In his five-month spell at Falkirk, Beck played 19 times in all competitions, scoring six goals.

Yeovil Town
Beck signed for Carlisle's fellow League Two club Yeovil Town on 24 July 2015 on a two-year contract. He made his debut on 8 August 2015 against Exeter City in a 3–2 defeat.

On 26 January 2016, Beck joined National League club Wrexham on loan until the end of the season.

Upon his return from his loan at Wrexham, Beck was released by Yeovil despite having a year left on his contract.

Darlington and Harrogate Town
In August 2016, Beck signed for National League North club Darlington. He made his debut on 13 August, scoring in a 4–1 win over Boston United. Beck finished the season as the club's top scorer with 18 goals, all in league competition. He returned to full-time football when signing for Darlington's National League North rivals Harrogate Town on 7 November 2017 for an undisclosed fee.

Beck joined National League North club York City on 23 July 2021 on loan until January 2022. He scored six goals from 25 appearances in all competitions before returning to Harrogate, where he played in 17 matches, mainly as a substitute, without scoring.

He was released at the end of the season, and rejoined Darlington in July 2022. His goalscoring form returned with six from the first eight games, and his first career hat-trick helped Darlington to come back twice from behind and eliminate divisional rivals Southport from the FA Cup second qualifying round on 17 September. By January, he was top scorer in the National North with 15 and had helped Darlington to third place in the table.

Solihull Moors
During the January 2023 transfer window, Solihull Moors of the National League met Beck's release clause and offered him terms beyond Darlington's reach. He signed a two-and-a-half-year contract with Moors on 26 January.

International career
Beck was eligible to represent Scotland at international level due to his grandfather being born in Scotland. He received a call up to the Scotland under-19 squad in January 2012. On the same day he made his international debut and scored his first international goal in a friendly against Sweden. Beck earned three caps at under-19 level, scoring one goal, all in 2013. He has also received a call-up to the Scotland under-21 team but did not make an appearance.

Career statistics

Honours
Harrogate Town
National League North play-offs: 2018
National League play-offs: 2020
FA Trophy: 2019–20

References

External links

Profile at the York City F.C. website

1994 births
Living people
Footballers from Sunderland
English footballers
Scottish footballers
Scotland youth international footballers
Association football forwards
Carlisle United F.C. players
Workington A.F.C. players
Falkirk F.C. players
Yeovil Town F.C. players
Wrexham A.F.C. players
Darlington F.C. players
Harrogate Town A.F.C. players
York City F.C. players
Solihull Moors F.C. players
English Football League players
National League (English football) players
English people of Scottish descent